George Ranch High School is a secondary school located in unincorporated Fort Bend County, Texas, United States, south of Richmond.

The school is part of the Lamar Consolidated Independent School District. The school was established in fall 2010 with the intent of relieving the student populations at the other high schools in LCISD.  George Ranch High School has approximately 2700 students.

It serves: portions of Rosenberg, unincorporated portions of Fort Bend County, the LCISD portion of Sugar Land (including Greatwood), Thompsons, and the communities of Crabb, and Canyon Gate.

The school's address is 8181 FM 762, Richmond, TX 77469, adjacent to Reading Junior High School. They won the 5A/D1 State Football Championship on December 18, 2015, defeating Lake Ridge High School 56–0. Clubs like TSA (Technology Student Association) also are very popular in this school as repeated TSA national appearances are very common.

Feeder schools

Junior high school
 Reading Junior High School

Middle school
 Polly Ryon Middle School

Elementary schools
 Bess Campbell Elementary School
 Susanna Dickinson Elementary School
 Manford Williams Elementary School
 Cora Thomas Elementary School
 William Velasquez Elementary School
Campbell, Dickinson, Williams, and Velasquez elementary schools entirely feed into George Ranch High School.

Notable alumni
 Darius Anderson, NFL running back for the Indianapolis Colts
 Kingsley Keke, NFL defensive end for the Green Bay Packers
 Kevin Kopps, baseball player
 Maddie Marlow, of Maddie and Tae, award-winning country music duo
 Quintin Morris, NFL tight end for the Buffalo Bills
 Stone Garrett, Outfielder for the Arizona Diamondbacks

References

External links

 

Lamar Consolidated Independent School District high schools
Educational institutions established in 2010
2010 establishments in Texas